The Pârâul lui Vasile is a left tributary of the river Miletin in Romania. It flows into the Miletin in Plugari.

References

Rivers of Romania
Rivers of Iași County
Rivers of Botoșani County